Hopkinton is the name of several places in the United States:

 Hopkinton, Iowa
 Hopkinton, Massachusetts, a New England town
 Hopkinton (CDP), Massachusetts, the main village in the town
 Hopkinton, New Hampshire
 Hopkinton, New York
 Hopkinton, Rhode Island, a New England town
 Hopkinton (CDP), Rhode Island, a village in the town